The Mayor of Mutare is the executive of the government of Mutare, Zimbabwe (known as Umtali until 1983). The Mayor is a member of the Mutare City Council, and is assisted by a deputy mayor. The Mayor uses the style "His Worship". The current mayor is Simon Chabuka.

History 
The Town of Umtali became a municipality, in the form of a town, on 11 June 1914. Its first mayor, elected in August 1914, was G. F. Dawson. The mayor and new municipal council replaced the Sanitary Board which had previously governed the settlement.

In 1980, following Zimbabwe's independence, Davidson Jahwi was elected the first black Mayor of Umtali.

Umtali's name was changed to Mutare in 1983.

In 2005, Mayor Misheck Kagurabadza (MDC–T) was suspended from his position by the Minister of Local Government, Ignatius Chombo. Mutare, along with other major cities that had seen their democratically elected MDC–T mayors suspended, was governed by a ZANU–PF-dominated special commission until 2008.

In 2008, Brian James, a white MDC–T member, was elected mayor. He was suspended and then fired in 2008 by Ignatius Chombo, who accused James of mismanagement, misconduct, and insubordination. However, the firing was, in reality, thought to be politically motivated.

Deputy mayors

Notable former deputy mayors 
 Leslie Herbert Morris, future mayor
 John Constantinos Kircos, future mayor
 E. M. Phillips, future mayor

List of mayors 
The following is a list of past mayors of Mutare (previously known as Umtali until 1983).

References 

Mutare
Lists of political office-holders in Zimbabwe
Mayors of places in Zimbabwe